This is a list of the National Register of Historic Places listings in Jack County, Texas.

This is intended to be a complete list of properties listed on the National Register of Historic Places in Jack County, Texas. Two properties are listed on the national register in the county, including one National Historic Landmark, which is also designated as a state historic site and state antiquities landmark and includes recorded Texas historic landmarks within.

Current listings

The locations of national register properties may be seen in a mapping service provided.

|}

Former listings

|}

See also

National Register of Historic Places listings in Texas
List of National Historic Landmarks in Texas
List of Texas State Historic Sites
Recorded Texas Historic Landmarks in Jack County

References

External links

Jack County, Texas
Jack County
Buildings and structures in Jack County, Texas